Irma Becerra-Fernandez is a Cuban-American higher education leader and the seventh president of Marymount University in Arlington, Virginia. She has held this role since July 1, 2018. Prior to her current post, she was the Provost and Chief Academic Officer at St. Thomas University, a nonprofit, private university located in Miami, Florida.

Education
Becerra received Bachelor of Science and Master of Science degrees in Electrical Engineering from the University of Miami. She received a doctoral degree from Florida International University, also in Electrical Engineering.

Career 
Becerra took office as the seventh President of Marymount University in Arlington, Va., on July 1, 2018. In her first six months in the role, she launched the University's new Strategic Plan, "Momentum," which is guiding the University over the five-year period from 2019 to 2024. The plan calls for Marymount to achieve national and international recognition for innovation and commitment to student success, alumni achievement and faculty and staff excellence.

In her time as President, Becerra has introduced several initiatives in support of Marymount's mission and vision for the future. This includes adding market-driven academic programs that prioritize career preparation, overseeing the transition to a new academic structure, acquiring The Rixey luxury apartment building next door to Marymount's Ballston Center and improving the university's IT infrastructure through the implementation of the state-of-the-art enterprise resource planning application, Workday. She has also navigated the school community through the impacts of the COVID-19 pandemic, while also leading efforts at the state and federal levels to advocate for legislative solutions to the DACA program that will protect Dreamer students at Marymount and across the country.

One year into Becerra's presidency, Moody's Investors Service downgraded Marymount's bond rating and revised its outlook to negative, noting in its report that the $96 million investment in acquiring The Rixey had left Marymount highly leveraged, with $150 million in total debt. Moody's further downgraded Marymount's debt in January, 2023.

A Cuban-born American, Becerra immigrated to the United States with her parents when she was an infant, living in Puerto Rico through high school. She earned both bachelor's and master's degrees in electrical engineering from the University of Miami and went on to become the first woman to earn a Ph.D. in Electrical Engineering from Florida International University (FIU).

Prior to Marymount, she served as Provost and Chief Academic Officer at St. Thomas University in Miami Gardens, Fla., from 2014 to 2018. In those four years, she led the expansion of academic offerings, launching 19 new market-driven degrees that included Nursing and Cybersecurity. Other initiatives included the development of fully-online programs, the establishment of the University's Student Success Center and the implementation of structural changes and new technology.

Before St. Thomas, Becerra spent three decades at FIU in a variety of positions that include Vice President, Vice Provost, Entrepreneurship Center Director and tenured professor in Management Information Systems. She founded FIU's Knowledge Management Lab and led major projects as principal investigator at the National Science Foundation, NASA (Headquarters, Kennedy, Ames and Goddard Space Flight Centers) and the Air Force Research Lab. She was also a Sloan Scholar at MIT's Center for Information Systems Research.

Becerra has authored four books and numerous journal articles in the areas of knowledge management and business intelligence. Her original research has also spanned such areas as enterprise systems, disaster management and IT entrepreneurship.

Books

Journal articles

Awards and recognition
 Named as one of the winners in the 2022 Women in Leadership Awards by Virginia Business.
 Saluted as one of the Top 35 Women in Higher Education by Diverse: Issues in Higher Education, 2020.
Recognized in the Washington Business Journal's (WBJ) Power 100 Class of 2019.
Selected as one of the Washington Business Journal's (WBJ) "Women Who Mean Business," 2019.
 Educator of the Year by the South Florida Hispanic Chamber of Commerce, 2015.
 Bronze Medal Award by the Miami Today Newspaper, 2014.
 2013 Educator of the Year by HENAAC Great Minds in STEM
 In the Company of Women Award for Education and Research, a Women's History Month Celebration, with support from The Parks Foundation of Miami-Dade, the Office of the Mayor and the Board of County Commissioners, March 2012.
 The Association of Cuban Engineers' Engineer of the Year Award for outstanding contributions to the profession, 2011.
 Kauffman Entrepreneurship Professor, Florida International University Pino Center for Entrepreneurship, March 2007.
 Selected for initiation into the professional business fraternity, Delta Sigma Pi, for academic achievements and continued interest in the profession, April 2006.
 Florida International University Torch Award for Outstanding Faculty (presented by the FIU Alumni Association), 2004.

References

External links
 About President Becerra - Marymount University

Year of birth missing (living people)
Living people
St. Thomas University (Florida)
American academic administrators
Women academic administrators
University of Miami College of Engineering alumni
Florida International University alumni
Marymount University